The 1935 All England Championships was a badminton tournament held at the Royal Horticultural Halls, Westminster, England from March 4 to March 10, 1935.

Final results

Results

Men's singles

+ Denotes seed

Women's singles

 Alice Woodroffe married and competed as Alice Teague

References

All England Open Badminton Championships
All England
All England Open Badminton Championships in London
1935 in badminton
March 1935 sports events
1935 in London